Mike Long (born October 13, 1946 in Albany, New York) is an American basketball coach and former basketball player. He is currently the head men's basketball coach at Hudson Valley Community College. In November 2019, he won his 500th career game. He has been inducted into four different Halls of Fame: The College of Saint Rose Hall of Fame (April 1992), Bishop Maginn High School (Former Vincentian Institute) Athletics Hall of Fame (May 2006), and the NYS Capital District Basketball Hall of Fame (June 2010) alongside Capital District coaching legend Doc Sauers. In September 2019, he was inducted into the Sage Colleges Athletic Hall of Fame.

Youth
Growing up in Menands, NY, Long's primary sport as a child was baseball.  He played pitcher, and while playing Little League pitched numerous no-hitters and on one occasion pitched a perfect game, striking out all 18 batters to face him.  When he reached high school, Long transferred to Vincentian Institute, a co-ed private school located in the Pine Hills neighborhood of Albany, NY.

Playing career
At V.I, Long lettered in both basketball and baseball, excelling at both.  As the ace of V.I's pitching staff, Long was briefly scouted to play Major League Baseball. After throwing out his arm his senior year, Long decided to attend Siena College to play basketball.
Because freshmen at the time were not allowed to play varsity sports, he played for the freshman team his first year. After moving up to varsity, he instantly became the team's "go-to guy". He came down with mono his junior season, which sidelined him for half of that year. Nevertheless, he scored 862 career points. He possessed an outstanding shooting touch in an era before the three-point line came into existence. If it had been in use during Long's playing career, and if freshmen were allowed to play varsity at the time and he didn't miss significant time due to illness, one could imagine that scoring total would be well over 1,000.
In his senior year, he led the team in scoring with 462 total points for an average of 18.5 per game, both of which still rank in the top 20 single-season scoring annals at the college. That year, he also averaged 8.2 rebounds, which ranks in the top 15 in school annals for rebounds per game.  During his senior year, Long was scored 35 points in one game, which is the 10th-highest single game point total in Siena history.

Coaching career at Siena and St. Rose

Long served in the Army during Vietnam and upon return obtained the JV coaching job in 1972 at his alma mater, Siena College. He led his team to a 10–10 record in his only season at the school. At the start of the 1973 season, Long was named head men's basketball coach at The College of Saint Rose, taking control of the reigns for the Saints' (former St. Rose Mascot) inaugural season. . His first team there went 5-15 and the next year there weren't enough players to have a season.

It took Long only three years to get his team to over .500 (they went 6–15 in 1975/76 and 11–13 in 1976/77), when the team went 14–10 in 1977/78, winning its first NAC title.  The next three years were very successful (22–5, 23–6, 16–12), bringing the school three additional Northern Athletic Conference championships.

During his 12 seasons as head coach at St. Rose, he amassed a 166-155 record and 5 NAC championships, including two undefeated seasons in conference play. Long was inducted into The College of Saint Rose Athletic Hall of Fame in 1992. He is  affectionately nicknamed "The Father of Saint Rose Basketball" and on November 15, 2008, the court at the college was named in his honor.

At Sage-JCA

From 1986-1990, Long served as assistant at Sage Junior College of Albany to Bill Toomey. Toomey left JCA after the 1989/1990 season, and Long took over as head coach. Over his first three years at JCA, the team went 42–37. The two years that followed were highly successful. His team would go 23–7 in 1993/94 and 19–9 in 1994/95, led by Chad Thomas, who would later go on to start at the University of Rhode Island. Thomas still holds many season and career records at JCA, including career points with 1,229, single season points with 638, career steals with 230, single season steals with 121, and highest scoring average with 23.6 points per contest.

After the 1998/99 season, the school made the jump down from NJCAA Division I to NJCAA Division II. The decision to switch was a good one as the team finished as the #1 seed for the Region 3 tournament in 1999/00 and went 19–9 in 2000/01 and advanced to the semi-finals of the NJCAA Division II Region III tournament. At one point during the season, the Sabres were ranked as high as #15 in the nation.

The 2001/2002 season was the most successful season the school, and Long, ever had. The team went 27-4, losing all four games by no more than seven points, again advancing to the NJCAA Division II Region III tournament, and winning Long Region III Coach Of The Year award. The team was nationally ranked the whole season, reaching #8 at its highest point.

The school disbanded all of its athletic programs after the 2002/2003 season, one in which Long guided his team to a 19–9 record and a finish in the semi-finals of the NJCAA Division II Region III tournament. Long finished his 13-year career at JCA with a 222–142 record and numerous post season appearances.

The transition
Following his career at JCA, Long went to Christian Brothers Academy to help out with the varsity boys basketball team.  During his three years as the defensive supervisor, the team was one of the best defensive teams in the state, winning three consecutive Section II titles and finishing in the NYS semi-finals two of those three years.

A return home
In the summer of 2006, Long was offered to go back to Saint Rose as an assistant under former player Brian Beaury. Long accepted and became the interim head coach in December, when Beaury was forced to take a medical leave. At the time, the team was 2-2.  Long guided the team to a 19-8 record, 17-6 with Long as head coach, before Beaury came back to direct Saint Rose through the Northeast-10 conference tournament and into the NCAA's.

HVCC
On August 12, 2013, Long was named as the Head Men's Basketball Coach at Hudson Valley Community College in Troy, NY upon the departure of former coach Ken Dagostino, who left to coach at NAIA school Ave Maria. This appointment came ten years after his last head coaching job. After winning his first two games, the Vikings dropped their next two. On December 8, 2013, the Vikings beat Corning Community College, improving their record on the season to 4-3 and giving Long his 400th career victory as a collegiate head coach.

The Vikings started the 2014-2015 season (Long's second year) with a 5-0 record, the best start since the 2008-2009 season when they won the Region III, Division III Championship. They finished the year at 15-13.

Long's third season at HVCC (2015-2016) started with a 4-game winning streak for the 2nd straight season, including a pair of 40-point blowout victories. In the 5th game of the season taking on Herkimer, who was ranked 5th in the country, the Vikings trailed by 18 at the half and rallied to lead by 2 with five minutes left before falling by 7. Through 19 games,  the Vikings record stood at 12-7, but thanks to an 8-2 finish they ended the regular season at 20-9. They went on to lose a nail biter to Mohawk Valley in the regional quarterfinals to finish the season at 20-10. Due to the team exceeding expectations, Long was selected as both Mountain Valley Conference and NJCAA Region 3 Coach of the Year.  He was also selected as Region 3 Division 3 Coach of the Year and was awarded the Paul F. Bishop Coach of the Year, which is give annually to the best coach in the Athletic Department at HVCC.

After beginning the 2016-2017 season 1-4, the Vikings responded with a 16-4 mark over their next 20 games, including a pair of 6-game win streaks. The final record for the season was 18-11.

After a 4-12 start to the 2017-2018 season, the Vikings won 8 of their last 11 games, including a major upset over the then ranked #2 team in the nation, Herkimer,  to finish the season 12-15. Long was nominated for both Region and Conference Coach of the Year Awards. Despite not receiving these awards, it is considered his best coaching performance at Hudson Valley.

The 2018-2019 team was very highly touted, especially after routing eventual national champion Herkimer in an early season matchup by a score of 102-72, Herkimer's only loss on the season. The game was never really close and garnered HVCC much publicity, with many calling them the best team in the country. When the first national rankings were released, HVCC was ranked 5th. After losing two of their starting five at the break, they would eventually fall to 10th and then out of the final rankings. They went on to lose in the quarter-final round of the NJCAA Region 3 Tournament to Mohawk Valley, the nations 2nd highest ranked team. Their final record was 21-8. Point guard Caleb Canty set a school record for most 30-point games in a season and guard Brandon DeGrasse closed out his career within the school's top 10 in assists, rebounds, and steals. Forward O'Nandi Brooks garnered First Team All Region and First Team All Conference selections and Long was nominated for Region and Conference Coach of the Year for the fourth consecutive season, joining Herkimer's Matt Lee and Mohawk Valley's Matt St. Croix as the only coaches to be nominated in more than two consecutive years.

For the 6th time in 7 years, HVCC won their season opener for 2019-2020, as well as their home opener on November 8, 2019 which was also Long’s 100th win at the helm. On November 16, the Vikings came from down 15 with under 8 minutes left and 7 with just a little over a minute left to beat Rockland CC in overtime by a score of 103-93, giving Long 500 career victories as a college head coach. HVCC secured the 4 seed and a first-round bye in the 2020 NJCAA Region 3 tournament and beat Corning in the quarterfinals 91-66, marking the first time in a decade that HVCC made it to the Region 3 semi-finals. The Vikings lost to the second nationally ranked team, Mohawk Valley, in the NJCAA Region 3 Final Four to end their season at 23-8.

The 2020-2021 season was cancelled due to the COVID-19 pandemic. During the 2021-2022 season, the Vikings started out 6-5, but won 10 of their next 11. They finished the season with a final record of 16-7. During the season, Mike Long became the second all-time winningest coach in HVCC history. 

The 2022-2023 season saw the Vikings sweep the season series against Herkimer for the first time in over a decade, and they were winners of their first 5 games against nationally ranked opponents, including back-to-back wins over Corning and Genessee, who were both ranked in the top 5 at the time. Trevor Green won National Player of the Week after recording a triple double against Genessee, as the Vikings burst into the national rankings and would see themselves ranked as high as 6 nationally. They earned a first round bye for the NJCAA Region 3 tournament and beat Herkimer in the quarter finals. They would go on to lose to Mohawk Valley in the semi-final round to finish the year 17-10. Trevor Green finished his career 4th all time in HVCC's scoring records and become only the 5th player to reach the 1,000 point plateau.

AAU
In 1999, Long was persuaded by a friend to take the helm of an AAU team he wanted to create for his son. The Helderberg Hoopers were a 12 and under AAU basketball team which played its home games at Sage Junior College of Albany and the Albany College of Pharmacy.  With each passing year, the Hoopers moved up in age level so that it could maintain the original roster.  After several roster changes in 2000, the Hoopers roster remained intact for three years, winning a multitude of tournaments each season.  Long continued to coach the Hoopers while at CBA, but had to stop coaching them after the 2006 season because of NCAA recruiting restrictions.

All-time records

Head Coaching Records:

Siena: 10-10
St. Rose: 166-155
Sage-JCA: 222-142
HVCC: 154-95**

As of 3/10/23

*In 1999/2000, Long was not notified that a player was ineligible, and he was forced to forfeit five wins.
*In 2016-2017, a bench clearing altercation against Columbia-Greene forced the forfeiture of two games.
^Denotes seasons as assistant coach.

Accolades 

 9 regular season conference titles
 4 conference tournament titles
 NAC Coach of the Year (1979,1980)
 NJCAA Region III, Division II Coach of the Year (2002)
Mountain Valley Conference Coach of the Year (2016)
NJCAA Region III Coach of the Year (2016)
Paul F. Bishop Coach of the Year (2016)
 Bishop Maginn High School Hall of Fame (2006)
 College of Saint Rose Athletic Hall of Fame (1992)
 Upstate New York Basketball Hall of Fame (2010)
Sage Colleges Athletic Hall of Fame (2019)
 Sam Perkins Sportsmanship Award (2013)
 551-402 career won/loss record as head coach
 375-238 NJCAA career won/loss record

Updated 3/10/23

Notable players coached 

 Chad Thomas, started ahead of NBA star Cuttino Mobley at the University of Rhode Island, leading them into the NCAA Tournament's Sweet Sixteen as a senior
 Dwayne Barnes, former Northeastern University star
 Rob Villanueva, brother of NBA star Charlie Villanueva
 Greg Plummer, professional basketball player in Mexico, CBA, and NBA D-League
 Brian Beaury, current head coach at The College of Saint Rose, only player in all-time top 10 steals and assists
 Famous Brown, stepbrother of former NBA star Kenny Anderson

References 

|https://www.hvcc.edu/athletics/mbasketball/basketballstory.php?id=8155
|https://www.hvcc.edu/athletics/mbasketball/basketballstory.php?id=8294
|http://www.troyrecord.com/sports/20131105/long-ready-for-new-challenge-at-hvcc

1946 births
Living people
American men's basketball coaches
Basketball players from New York (state)
High school basketball coaches in the United States
Junior college men's basketball coaches in the United States
Sportspeople from Albany, New York
Siena Saints men's basketball coaches
Siena Saints men's basketball players
Saint Rose Golden Knights men's basketball coaches
American men's basketball players
Basketball coaches from New York (state)